Malcolm, Malcom, or Mal Brown may refer to:

Sports
Malcolm Brown (baseball) (1899–1951), American Negro leagues baseball player
Malcolm Brown (speedway rider) (born 1935), English speedway rider
Mal Brown (born 1946), Australian rules footballer
Malcolm Brown (English footballer) (born 1956), English footballer
Malcolm Brown (American football) (born 1993), American football running back
Malcom Brown (born 1994), American football defensive tackle

Others
Malcolm Brown (politician) (1881–1939), member of the New South Wales Legislative Assembly
Malcolm Brown (art director) (1903–1967), American art director
Dr. G. Malcolm Brown (1916–1977), Canadian physician
Malcolm Brown (journalist) (born 1947), Australian journalist, editor and author

See also
Malcolm Browne (1931–2012), American journalist and photographer